The chestnut-headed bee-eater (Merops leschenaulti), or bay-headed bee-eater, is a near passerine bird in the bee-eater family Meropidae. It is a resident breeder in the Indian subcontinent and adjoining regions, ranging from India east to Southeast Asia.

This species, like other bee-eaters, is a richly coloured, slender bird. It is predominantly green, with blue on the rump and lower belly. Its face and throat are yellow with a black eye stripe, and the crown and nape are rich chestnut. The thin curved bill is black. Sexes are alike, but young birds are duller.

This species is 18–20 cm long; it lacks the two elongated central tail feathers possessed by most of its relatives.

Description

Forehead, crown, nape, lower face and ear-coverts bright chestnut ; lores black, continued as a band under the eye and ear-coverts ; wing-coverts, lower back and tertiaries green, the latter tipped with bluish; rump and upper tail-coverts pale shining blue; primaries and secondaries green, rufous on the inner webs, and all tipped dusky ; central tail-feathers bluish on the outer, and green on the inner webs ; the others green, margined on the inner web with brown and all tipped dusky ; sides of face, chin and throat yellow ; below this a broad band of chestnut extending to the sides of the neck and meeting the chestnut of the upper plumage ; below this again a short distinct band of black and then an ill-defined band of yellow ; remainder of lower plumage green, tipped with blue, especially on the vent and under tail-coverts.

The Javan sub-species, M. l. quinticolor, differs in having the whole space from the bill down to the black pectoral band pure yellow without any chestnut, and in having the tail blue.

Race andamanensis found in the Andamans is slightly larger than the Indian race.
Iris crimson ; bill black ; legs dusky black ; claws dark horn-colour.

Habits

This is a bird which breeds in sub-tropical open woodland, often near water. It is most common in highland areas. As the name suggests, bee-eaters predominantly eat insects, especially bees, wasps and  hornets, which are caught in the air by sorties from an open perch.

These bee-eaters are gregarious, nesting colonially in sandy banks. They make a relatively long tunnel in which the 5 to 6 spherical white eggs are laid. Both the male and the female take care of the eggs. These birds also feed and roost communally. The call is similar to that of the European bee-eater.

Its scientific name commemorates the French botanist Jean Baptiste Leschenault de la Tour.

Notes

References
 Fry, C.H., Fry, K. & Harris, A. (1992) Kingfishers, Bee-eaters & Rollers. London: Christopher Helm. 
 Grimmett, R., Inskipp, C. & Inskipp, T. (2012) Birds of the Indian Subcontinent. Helm Field Guides.  
 Kazmierczak, K. & van Perlo, B. (2008) A Field Guide to the Birds of the Indian Subcontinent. Pica Press. .

External links

 Oriental Bird Images: chestnut-headed bee-eater  Selected images
 Xeno-canto: chestnut-headed bee-eater  Sound recordings

chestnut-headed bee-eater
Birds of Sri Lanka
Birds of Bhutan
Birds of India
Birds of Nepal
Birds of Bangladesh
Birds of Southeast Asia
chestnut-headed bee-eater
chestnut-headed bee-eater